Ihlow is a village and a municipality in the district of Aurich, in Lower Saxony, Germany. It is situated approximately 8 km southwest of Aurich, and 15 km east of Emden.

References

Towns and villages in East Frisia
Aurich (district)